Hassan Athumani Ngwilizi (born 1 April 1944) is a Tanzanian CCM politician and member of Parliament for Mlalo constituency since 2005.

References

( Died 20 May 2019)

1944 births
Living people
Chama Cha Mapinduzi MPs
Tanzanian MPs 2010–2015
Tanga Secondary School alumni
Karimjee Secondary School alumni
National Defence College, India alumni